My Dear Miss Aldrich is a 1937 low-budget comedy film starring Maureen O'Sullivan, Walter Pidgeon, and Edna May Oliver about a young woman who inherits a New York City newspaper and decides to become a reporter rather than a publisher.

Plot
Martha Aldrich (O'Sullivan) is a young woman from Nebraska who inherits a New York City newspaper from a distant relative. She's accompanied to New York by her aunt, Mrs. Lou Atherton (Oliver). Editor Ken Morley (Pidgeon), whose Globe-Leader newspaper is in hot competition with the Chronicle, refuses to hire a woman as a journalist. But as owner, Aldrich demands to be hired and is.  She quickly scoops the male staff on a royal birth. But when she keeps a society friend's wedding a secret, Morley fires her. Determined to win her job back, Aldrich spies on industrialist Talbot (Walter Kingsford) and trade union leader Sinclair (Paul Harvey) as they secretly negotiate a new collective bargaining agreement. Believing Aldrich has been kidnapped, Morley and Mrs. Atherton track her down as Mrs. Sinclair (Janet Beecher) tries to foil Aldrich's schemes in order to protect her husband. Aldrich gets her scoop, wins back her job, and marries Morley—who has fallen in love with her.

Cast
 Maureen O'Sullivan as Martha Aldrich
 Walter Pidgeon as Ken Morley
 Edna May Oliver as Mrs. Lou Atherton
 Rita Johnson as Ellen Warfield
 Janet Beecher as Mrs. Sinclair
 Paul Harvey as Mr. Sinclair
 Walter Kingsford as Mr. Talbot

Production
The film was written by Herman J. Mankiewicz. It was one of a number of scripts written by Mankiewicz early in his career which film historian Charles Higham called "hackwork" and "manufactured...written without enthusiasm". The director was George B. Seitz, a director best known for the gentle and bland "Andy Hardy" series of family comedies which starred Mickey Rooney.

Reception
According to MGM records, the movie earned $238,000 in the US and Canada and $120,000 elsewhere, making a $1,000 profit.

The film later aired as a radio play on The MGM Theater of the Air on July 21, 1950, with Donna Reed in the title role.

References

External links
Mr Dear Miss Aldrich at TCMDB

Metro-Goldwyn-Mayer films
1937 comedy-drama films
American comedy-drama films
Films with screenplays by Herman J. Mankiewicz
American black-and-white films
1937 films
1930s English-language films
1930s American films